Gardiner High School may refer to:
 Turks and Caicos (United Kingdom)
Raymond Gardiner High School, North Caicos
 United States
Gardiner High School (Maine)
Gardiner High School (Montana)